Thermopylae is a 1966 bronze sculpture by Dimitri Hadzi, installed at  Boston City Hall Plaza near the John F. Kennedy Federal Building, in Boston's Government Center, in the U.S. state of Massachusetts.

Description
The abstract sculpture is approximately 12 ft. tall and 16 ft. wide, and weighs 2.5 tons. It was commissioned by the commissioned by the General Services Administration and commemorates John F. Kennedy. A plaque reads: "THERMOPYLAE" / DIMITRI HADZI, SCULPTOR / "THERMOPYLAE", WHICH IS A 12-FOOT HIGH, 2-1/2 TON BRONZE SCULPTURE, WAS INSPIRED, / "PROFILES IN COURAGE" AND THE BRILLIANT WAR RECORD OF PRESIDENT JOHN F. KENNEDY, / IT IS NAMED AFTER THE GREEK BATTLE WHERE THE SPARTANS, IN A DISPLAY OF GREAT / COURAGE, FOUGHT THE PERSIANS TO THE LAST MAN. / THOROUGHLY SYMBOLIC IN ITS ABSTRACT SHAPES, BASICALLY ORGANIC IN FORM, THE HEAVY / FORMS CONTRAST WITH THIN, SOLID WITH OPEN, VERTICAL WITH HORIZONTAL, AND ROUND / WITH ANGULAR. THROUGH THE EFFECT OF THE SUN, RAIN, AND SNOW ON THE SCULPTURE, / THE VIEWER IS PROVIDED WITH EVER CHANGING VISUAL AND EMOTIONAL EXPERIENCES.

The sculpture was surveyed by the Smithsonian Institution's "Save Outdoor Sculpture!" program in 1997.

See also

 1966 in art

References

External links
 

1966 establishments in Massachusetts
1966 sculptures
Abstract sculptures in the United States
Bronze sculptures in Massachusetts
Government Center, Boston
Monuments and memorials in Boston
Outdoor sculptures in Boston